Carsten Kammlott (born 28 February 1990) is a German professional footballer who plays as a forward.

References

External links
 
 

1990 births
Living people
German footballers
Association football forwards
Germany youth international footballers
FC Rot-Weiß Erfurt players
RB Leipzig players
FSV Wacker 90 Nordhausen players
3. Liga players
People from Bad Frankenhausen
Footballers from Thuringia
21st-century German people